The Canal is a 1979 Turkish drama film directed by Erden Kıral. It was entered into the 11th Moscow International Film Festival.

Cast
 Tarik Akan as The lieutenant governor
 Meral Orhonsay as Zeynep, the physician
 Kamran Usluer as Haþim Aga
 Tuncel Kurtiz as Abuzer
 Ali Demir
 Menderes Samancilar

References

External links
 

1979 films
1979 drama films
Turkish drama films
1970s Turkish-language films
Films directed by Erden Kıral